King George Tower was a proposed skyscraper in Surrey, British Columbia near King George Station. The skyscraper also would have had the most floors of any building in Canada, exceeding the 78 floors of Aura in Toronto, Ontario. However, due to the proposed height of the project, there was concern that the skyscraper may interfere with air traffic heading to Vancouver International Airport.

References

Proposed skyscrapers in Canada
Buildings and structures in Surrey, British Columbia
James K. M. Cheng buildings